Herbert B. Cohen (July 2, 1900 – December 2, 1970) was a Pennsylvania lawyer, politician, and judge.  He served terms as Attorney General and Supreme Court Justice.

Life and career

Cohen was born the son of Isaac I. and Pauline (Kagan) Cohen.  During World War I, he served in the USNR.  He graduated from Wharton (1922) and the University of Pennsylvania Law School (1925).

He married Mildred Charlap, they had two children.  He was active in Jewish affairs, serving on the board of directors of the Jewish Community Center of York and of the Jewish Publication Society.

He served in the state House of Representatives for four consecutive terms, 1933–40, twice as Majority leader, once as Minority leader.

He was appointed Attorney General in 1955, and in 1957 was elevated to the state Supreme Court, where he served until his death in 1970.

References

External links
 

1900 births
1970 deaths
Wharton School of the University of Pennsylvania alumni
University of Pennsylvania Law School alumni
Pennsylvania Attorneys General
Justices of the Supreme Court of Pennsylvania
Politicians from York, Pennsylvania
20th-century American judges
Jewish American people in Pennsylvania politics
20th-century American Jews